Discoconchoecia elegans is a species of ostracods in the subfamily Conchoeciinae. It is found in Norway.

References

External links 
 

Crustaceans described in 1866
Halocyprida
Fauna of Norway